Cladophialophora bantiana (C. bantiana) is a dematiaceous fungus known to cause brain abscesses in humans.  It is one of the most common causes of invasive phaeohyphomycosis in humans. Cladophialophora bantiana is a member of the phylum ascomycota and has been isolated from soil samples from around the world.

Etymology
Cladophialophora bantiana was first isolated from a brain abscess in 1911 by Guido Banti and was described by Pier Andrea Saccardo in 1912 as Torula bantiana.  In 1960, the fungus was reclassified by Borelli as Cladosporium bantianum.  A morphologically similar species, Cladosporium trichodes was described by Emmons et al. in 1952.  Cladosporium trichodes was widely believed to be a different species until 1995 when de Hoog et al. showed it to be conspecific with C. bantiana based on phylogenetic analysis.

Morphology
Cladophialophora bantiana exhibits predominantly hyphal growth both in vivo and in vitro.  The normal morphology consists of dark coloured largely unbranched, wavy chains of conidia, individually 5–10 µm in length. The dark colour is due to the presence of the dark pigment melanin. Hyphae are septate, as is the case for species belonging to the phylum ascomycota.  In samples isolated from cerebral tissue compared to cultured samples, a predominance of unbranched conidial chains and absence of conidiophores has been reported. In culture, the colony is black with a velvety texture or dark grey in colour, depending on the type of agar medium it is grown on. Cladophialophora bantiana has been reported to grow in culture under temperatures ranging from 14-42 °C with optimal growth around 30 °C. Cladophialophora bantiana grows slowly in vitro, taking ~15 days to mature when grown at 25–30 °C. Cladophialophora bantiana can be distinguished from other species of the genus Cladophialophora by the presence of the enzyme urease.

Infection

Non-human
Cladophialophora bantiana can cause infection in several species of animals including cats,  dogs,  and humans.  However, it is very rare to find it in non-mammalian species.  In one case in a dog, C. bantiana was identified as the causative agent of eumycetoma.  It has been known to cause systemic phaeohyphomycosis in both cats and dogs.

Human
Cladophialophora bantiana is known to cause a cerebral phaeohyphomycosis affecting the central nervous system in humans.  It is hypothesized that predilection of this species for the central nervous system is due to the presence of melanin, which may be able to cross the blood–brain barrier. However, this is unlikely since fungal melanin is structurally and biochemically different from human melanin and other species of highly pigmented fungi do not show neurotropism.  It has also been suggested that the presence of introns in the 18S rDNA subunit of Cladophialophora may be related to the preference of C. bantiana for the CNS, however more research is required to determine the mechanism of this.

In a review of 101 cases of phaeohyphomycosis by Revankar et al., C. bantiana was the causal agent responsible for 48% of cases.  It most often manifests as brain abscesses in immunocompetent people, however meningitis and myelitis were observed in a limited number of cases.  Although the majority of the patients were immunocompetent (73%), infection is also commonly seen in immunocompromised patients. Clinical symptoms of infection are varied and can include headache, seizure, arm pain, and ataxia.  The mortality rate is about 70%, with better outcomes observed in patients who underwent complete excision of the abscess. Since infection is very rare, there is no standard therapy for treatment of C. bantiana phaeohyphomycosis, however combination of amphotericin B, flucytosine, and itraconazole has been associated with improved outcomes. Since the majority of patients infected were immunocompetent, the means of exposure to the fungi is still unclear. However, inhalation is the likely route of entrance.

Cases of infection are most commonly found in subtropical regions with high average humidity although cases have also been identified in the US, Canada and the UK.  Cases from regions with hot, arid climate are rare.  It has also been suggested to occupations with high exposure to dust and dirt such as farming and gardening are associated with higher risk of infection.

References

Eurotiomycetes
Animal fungal diseases